Severe Tropical Storm Zita, known in the Philippines as Tropical Storm Luming, was a short-lived tropical cyclone that killed seven people throughout southern China in August 1997. Maintaining this intensity, the storm made a second landfall in northern Vietnam later that day before rapidly weakening over land. The remnants of Zita were last noted over extreme northwestern Vietnam on August 24.

Although a relatively weak system, Tropical Storm Zita caused significant damage in Southern China. There, seven people were known to have been killed by the storm and damage reached $433 million (1997 USD). However, a report from Dartmouth College states that 345 people were killed by the storm. In Vietnam, significantly less damage took place; no fatalities were reported and losses reached $5 million (1997 USD).

Meteorological history

Severe Tropical Storm Zita originated from a tropical disturbance over the South China Sea which was first identified by the JTWC on August 19, 1997, roughly 555 km (345 mi) west of the northern Philippines. By August 20, a low-level circulation developed and deep convection persisted around the center. Situated within an easterly flow, the system tracked westward towards the southern Chinese island of Hainan as it strengthened. Later that day, a Tropical Cyclone Formation Alert was issued for the disturbance; around the same time, the Japan Meteorological Agency (JMA) began monitoring the system as a tropical depression. Hours later, the JTWC classified the depression as Tropical Storm Zita, the 15th named storm of the season. Early the next day, the JMA followed suit and upgraded Zita to a tropical storm according to ten-minute sustained wind standards. Additionally, the Philippine Atmospheric, Geophysical and Astronomical Services Administration issued a few advisories on the system as it existed within their area of responsibility, during which time it was given the local Filipino name Luming.

Situated in a region with little to no wind shear, the storm's outflow quickly became established and banding features wrapped around the periphery. Although the storm moved over land, it maintained its intensity as it entered the Gulf of Tonkin. Around 2200 UTC, Zita made its final landfall near Cẩm Phả, Vietnam. Rapid weakening ensued as it moved further inland. Early on August 23, the JTWC issued their final advisory on the storm as it weakened to a tropical depression. However, the JMA continued to monitor Zita until it dissipated early on August 24 over extreme northwestern Vietnam.

Impact
Prior to the storm's arrival in China, officials evacuated roughly 54,000 people from dangerous areas. In southern China, Tropical Storm Zita produced torrential rainfall across Guangdong Province, triggering widespread flooding and landslides. At least seven are known to have been killed in the province and damage reached $433 million (1997 USD). However, a report from Dartmouth College states that 345 people were killed by the storm. Roughly  An estimated 55,170 km2 (21,300 mi2) of land was affected by the storm-induced floods, home to roughly 5.65 million people. In the city of Zhanjiang alone, 36,000 homes were destroyed and 80% of the coastal crops were lost. Throughout the Leizhou Peninsula, 332,650 hectares (822,000 acres) of farmland were damaged by the storm.

High winds downed power lines, leaving an estimated 1,900 people without power at the height of the storm. Throughout the city, damage amounted to HK$550,000 (US$70,747). In Vietnam, the storm produced widespread heavy rainfall, leaving $5 million (1997 USD) in damage but no fatalities. Zita's remnants also brought significant rainfall to parts of neighboring Laos.

See also

Tropical Storm Koguma
Typhoon Mujigae (2015)
Tropical Storm Mujigae (2009)
Tropical Storm Dianmu (2016)
Tropical Storm Jebi (2013)

References

External links

JMA General Information of Severe Tropical Storm Zita (9715) from Digital Typhoon
JMA Best Track Data (Graphics) of Severe Tropical Storm Zita (9715)
JMA Best Track Data (Text)
JTWC Best Track Data of Typhoon 17W (Zita)
17W.ZITA from the U.S. Naval Research Laboratory

1997 Pacific typhoon season
1997 in Vietnam
Western Pacific severe tropical storms
1997 disasters in the Philippines
Typhoons in the Philippines
Typhoons in Vietnam